Elmar Salulaht (until 1937 Elmar Soop; 17 April 1910 Tartu – 7 October 1974 Tartu) was an Estonian actor and opera singer (bass).

From 1923 to 1936 he worked as a metalworker. He studied singing with Georg Stahlberg. From 1936 to 1939 he was a singer and actor at the Vanemuine theatre in Tartu and from 1939 to 1940 at the Narva Theatre. From 1942 to 1943 he was an actor at the Estonian Theatre and from 1943 to 1974, he returned to the at the Vanemuine.

Besides stage roles he also appeared as an actor on films: he played the lead role the feature film Põrgupõhja uus Vanapagan (1964). Salulaht is buried in Rahumäe cemetery.

Awards
Meritorious Artist of the Estonian SSR (1967)

Filmography
 1964: Põrgupõhja uus Vanapagan (1964)
 1967: Keskpäevane praam (1967)
 1970: Kolme katku vahel (1970)
 1970: Tuulevaikus (1970)
 1972: Maaletulek	(1972)
 1972: Väike reekviem suupillile (1972)

References

1910 births
1974 deaths
20th-century Estonian male opera singers
Estonian male musical theatre actors
Estonian male stage actors
Estonian male film actors
20th-century Estonian male actors
Male actors from Tartu
Burials at Rahumäe Cemetery
Soviet male actors
Soviet opera singers